The Orthon River is a river in the Pando Department of Bolivia and a tributary of river Beni.

See also
List of rivers of Bolivia

References
Rand McNally, The New International Atlas, 1993.

Rivers of Pando Department